Mrigendra Dutta    (27 October 1915 – 3 September 1933) was an Indian revolutionary and member of the Bengal Volunteers who carried out assassinations against British colonial officials in an attempt to secure Indian independence.

Family 
Mrigen was born in  Paharipur Village in Medinipur in 1915. His father name was Beni Madhab Dutta. He completed his early education from  Midnapur Town School.

Revolutionary activities 
After the murder of Magistrate Paddy and Robert Douglas no British officer was ready to take the charge of Midnapore District.  Mr. Bernard E J Burge, a District Magistrate was posted in Midnapore district.The members of the Bengal volunteers i.e. Ramkrishna Roy, Brajakishore Chakraborty,Prabhanshu Sekhar Pal, Kamakhya Charan Ghosh, Sonatan Roy, Nanda Dulal Singh, Sukumar Sen Gupta, Bijoy Krishna Ghose, Purnananda Sanyal, Manindra Nath Choudhury, Saroj Ranjan Das Kanungo, Santi Gopal Sen, Sailesh Chandra Ghose, Anath Bondhu Panja and Mrigendra Dutta decided to assassinate him.Ramkrishna Roy, Brajakishore Chakraborty, Nirmal Jibon Ghosh  and Mrigendra Dutta planned to shot him dead while Burge was playing a football match ( Bradley-Birt football tournament) named by Francis Bradley Bradley-Birt at the police grounds of Midnapore. Burge, during the half time of the football match in Police parade ground Burge was killed on 2 September 1933 by Anath Bondhu Panja and Mrigendra Dutta. Anathbandhu was killed instantly by the body guard of the DM and Mrigendra Dutta died in the hospital on the next day.  Anath Bondhu Panja and Mrigendra Dutta was acquitted on murder charge of the district magistrate of Midnapore,

Death 
Mrigendra Dutta died in the Midnapore Sadar Hospital now Midnapore Medical College and Hospital on the next day i.e. 2 September 1933.

References

1915 births
1933 deaths
Revolutionary movement for Indian independence
Indian nationalism
Indian people convicted of murder
Indian revolutionaries
People from Paschim Medinipur district
Revolutionaries from West Bengal
Indian independence activists from West Bengal